Sergio Roberto Santos Rodrigues (September 22, 1927 – September 1, 2014) was a Brazilian carioca architect and designer. Along with Joaquim Tenreiro and José Zanine Caldas, Rodrigues was the pioneer to transform the Brazilian design in industrial design and make it known worldwide.
He began his work in the field of architecture in the project of the civic center along with the also architects David Azambuja, Flávio Régis do Nascimento e Olavo redig de Campos.

Had the peak of his career in the 50s and 60s. Worked with furniture design according with the modernism, bringing the Brazilian identity to his projects, both in the design and traditional materials – leather, wood and rattan – exalting the Brazilian and native culture.

“In fact, in this moment he did coexist the Brazilian-Brazil with the Girl-from-Ipanema, sang later (1962) by Tom Jobim and Vinicius de Moraes in the famous "Girl from Ipanema"” (Oscar Niemeyer).

Contemporary of Oscar Niemeyer and Lúcio Costa, his furniture was utilized in large scale in the construction of Brazil's capital Brasília.

“In that time (begin of Brasília) we didn't have time to think about designing any furniture. We used the furniture from the market, selecting as the Palace wanted. The main designer to whom we selected was Sergio Rodrigues” (Lúcio Costa).

His most famous work in the Sheriff's chair (1957), made in leather and wood, with fit and upholstery innovations that inspired works until today.

“The piece of furniture is not just the shape, not just the material which is made but also something inside it. It's the piece's spirit. It's the Brazilian spirit. It's the Brazilian furniture” (Sergio Rodrigues). He died in 2014 at Rio de Janeiro of liver failure.

Exhibitions

2010 - Sergio Rodrigues: Um Designer from the Tropics - Rio de Janeiro, Brazil

2009 - Brazil Influence - Brussels, Belgium

2008 - Brazil Home Design - Buenos Aires, Argentina.

2008 - Biennial Iberoamerican of Design - Madrid, Spain

2008 - Time e Place: Rio de Janeiro 1956/1964 - Modern Musset - Stockholm, Sweden

2005 - Expo in 25th Century - New York

2000 - Launching of the book "Sergio Rodrigues"

1998 - Mostra Internacional do Design - Método e Industrialismo - Cenctro Cultural Banco do Brasil - Rio de Janeiro

1998 - Bienal de Arquitetura

1997 - 40 anos de Mole - Expo at the Rio Design Leblon - Rio de Janeiro.

1993 - Exhibition "Brasille 93" - La Construzione Di Una Identità Culturale Universidade de Brescia- Italia

1991 - Falando de Cadeira - Museu de Arte Moderna - Rio de Janeiro

1987 - Lapiz de Plata award - Buenos Aires

1984 - Cadeira: Evolução e Design - Museu da Casa Brasileira-São Paulo

1984 - Tradição e Ruptura: Desenho Industrial

1982 - O Design no Brasil: História e Realidade- SESC/SP

1892 - Saudades do Brasil: A Era JK - Exposição Itinerante

References

External links
https://web.archive.org/web/20090921090924/http://www.sergiorodrigues.com.br/english/index.asp
https://web.archive.org/web/20120425045616/http://www.renome.com.br/en/designers/56-sergio-rodrigues

1927 births
2014 deaths
Brazilian architects
Brazilian furniture designers
People from Rio de Janeiro (city)